Askatuak Saki-Baloi Taldea is a basketball club based in San Sebastián, in the Basque Country of Spain, that plays in the Liga EBA.

History
The team competed for four years in the top Spanish league, one of them in the Liga ACB. They also played for the Korać Cup during two seasons. In 1993 Askatuak sold its 1ª División (second tier) spot to CB Salamanca.

Years later, in 2001, the team resigned its berth in LEB Plata and was substituted as the first basketball team in San Sebastián by the new Gipuzkoa BC.

For the following seasons, Askatuak played in lower divisions, achieving promotions to Liga EBA in 2010 and to LEB Plata in 2012.

Season by season

Trophies and awards

Trophies
2nd division championships: (1)
2ª División: (1) 1976
Liga EBA: (1)
2012

References

External links
Official website

Sports teams in San Sebastián
Basque basketball teams
Former LEB Plata teams
Former Liga EBA teams
Former Liga ACB teams
Former LEB Oro teams